Castlesessagh is a townland of 165 acres (67.53 ha) in County Tyrone, Northern Ireland. It is situated in the civil parish of Urney and the historic barony of Omagh West. Parts of the town of Castlederg are located in this townland.

See also
List of townlands of County Tyrone

References

Townlands of County Tyrone
Civil parish of Urney